The 14631 / 32 Dehradun Amritsar Express is an Express train belonging to Indian Railways - Northern Railway zone that runs between Dehradun & Amritsar Junction in India.

It operates as train number 14631 from Dehradun to Amritsar Junction and as train number 14632 in the reverse direction serving the 4 states of Uttarakhand, Uttar Pradesh, Haryana & Punjab.

Coaches

The 14631 / 32 Dehradun Amritsar Express presently has 2 AC 3 tier, 8 Sleeper Class, 4 General Unreserved & 2 SLR (Seating cum Luggage Rake) coaches. It does not carry a Pantry car coach.

As is customary with most train services in India, Coach Composition may be amended at the discretion of Indian Railways depending on demand.

Service

The 14631 Dehradun Amritsar Express covers the distance of 463 kilometres in 12 hours 25 mins [] & in 12 hours 30 mins as 14632 Amritsar Dehradun Express [].

Routeing

The 14631 / 32 Dehradun - Amritsar Express runs from Dehradun via Haridwar Junction, Laksar Junction, Saharanpur Junction, Ambala Cantonment Junction, Ludhiana Junction to Amritsar Junction.

It reverses direction of travel at Laksar Junction.

Traction

As the route is electrified, Ghaziabad WAP 4 which powers the train for its journey.

Timings

14631 Dehradun Amritsar Express leaves Dehradun on a daily basis at 19:00 hrs IST and reaches Amritsar Junction at 07:30 hrs IST the next day.

14632 Amritsar Dehradun Express leaves Amritsar Junction on a daily basis at 22:10 hrs IST and reaches Dehradun at 10:35 hrs IST the next day.

References

External links

Trains from Dehradun
Transport in Amritsar
Express trains in India
Rail transport in Haryana
Rail transport in Punjab, India